KWKB (channel 20) is a religious television station licensed to Iowa City, Iowa, United States, serving the Eastern Iowa and Quad Cities television markets as an owned-and-operated station of Tri-State Christian Television (TCT). The station's transmitter is located on Baker Avenue in West Branch.

History
KWKB signed on the air August 30, 1999, as an affiliate of The WB. It carried the full WB and Kids' WB lineups.

From September 5, 2006, to September 16, 2011, KWKB was affiliated with both The CW as a primary network and MyNetworkTV as a secondary network. When KNVA in Austin, Texas became a sole CW affiliate in October 2009 after carrying MyNetworkTV as a secondary affiliation, KWKB became the only station in the country to have carried the full CW and MyNetworkTV lineups including The CW's Saturday morning children's block Toonzai (although CW affiliates KCWI in Des Moines, WLMT in Memphis and KXVO in Omaha carried WWE SmackDown! from MyNetworkTV until that show moved to cable channel Syfy in October 2010).

Until September 16, 2011, KWKB aired MyNetworkTV programming from 9 to 11 p.m., immediately following CW programming. The satellite feeds for MyNetworkTV and The CW are actually aired at the same time, so MyNetworkTV programming was recorded and broadcast two hours after it is aired on other MyNetworkTV affiliates. However, as of September 19, 2011, KWKB dropped MyNetworkTV in favor of syndicated fare. This briefly left the Cedar Rapids market one of two markets in Iowa without an affiliate for the network until October 3, when Des Moines' This TV affiliate KDMI re-affiliated with the network (as a secondary affiliation) after it had initially dropped it in 2009. However, as of October 2011, KCRG-TV digital channel 9.2 is carrying the MyNetworkTV programming service on a delayed basis from 12:05 to 2:05 a.m. KWKB was the last CW-affiliated station that carried MyNetworkTV on the same feed as The CW until 2014, when Columbia, South Carolina's existing MyNetworkTV affiliate WKTC, and later in 2016, when Chicago's MyNetworkTV (O&O) affiliate WPWR-TV added a primary CW affiliation while retaining MyNetworkTV as a secondary affiliation on their main channel.

KWKB lost The CW when their charter 10-year affiliation agreement expired in September 2016, when KWWL acquired the affiliation on their second subchannel. Concurrently, KWKB switched to This TV, taking that affiliation from KWWL's second subchannel. KWKB carried a mix of This TV programming along with its own syndicated programming.

In February 2011, KWKB began carrying the Antenna TV network on digital subchannel 20.2 until January 2015 when Antenna TV moved to KCRG-TV's digital subchannel 9.3. KWKB has been airing The Works on 20.2 since August 2015. Following the demise of The Works, the subchannel was replaced by Light TV.

In June 2018, Chicago-based KM Communications announced that it would sell KWKB to HC2 Holdings for $1,850,000; the sale was completed on January 29, 2019. In February 2019, KWKB dropped This TV and became an Azteca América owned-and-operated station; however, this status didn't last long, as the station would become an affiliate of the female-oriented network Escape (now Ion Mystery) in May.

On March 18, 2021, it was announced that KWKB and sister station KPNZ in Ogden, Utah would be sold to Marion, Illinois-based Tri-State Christian Television for $4 million. The sale was completed on August 2.

Subchannels
The station's digital signal is multiplexed:

References

External links

Tri-State Christian Television affiliates
Ion Mystery affiliates
TheGrio affiliates
Twist (TV network) affiliates
GetTV affiliates
WKB
Television channels and stations established in 1999
1999 establishments in Iowa
Iowa City, Iowa
KWKB